Numa François Gillet (born 1868, Bordeaux) was a French painter who was a member of the Salon des Artistes Français where he exhibited hors concours, he was also made a Chevalier of the Légion d'honneur. He often worked with his close friend Armand Point.

References

1868 births
Year of death missing
19th-century French painters
Artists from Bordeaux
Chevaliers of the Légion d'honneur